Zhukovskaya is a rural locality (a village) in Kumzerskoye Rural Settlement, Kharovsky District, Vologda Oblast, Russia. The population was 1 as of 2002.

Geography 
Zhukovskaya is located 53 km northwest of Kharovsk (the district's administrative centre) by road. Opurinskaya is the nearest rural locality.

References 

Rural localities in Kharovsky District